was a public senior high school in Zama, Kanagawa, Japan. It was in the Kanagawa Prefectural Board of Education.

It opened in 1987 and was named after the Hibarigaoka ("Hill of the Skylark") area. It was one of the last schools opened as part of a prefectural high school building program established in a 1973 plan.

During the school's life, it had special provisions for non-Japanese students.

It closed in 2009.

Sister schools
Hibarigaoka became the sister school of Leonardtown High School in Maryland, United States in October 1991, when the county board of education and representatives from Maryland formalized an agreement.

Hibarigaoka became the sister school of Goomeri State School in Australia in 2000.

References

External links
  Kanagawa Prefectural Hibarigaoka High School (Archive)
 English information

High schools in Kanagawa Prefecture
1987 establishments in Japan
Educational institutions established in 1987
2009 disestablishments in Japan
Educational institutions disestablished in 2009